The Autonomous Trade Unions Centre is a trade union centre in Benin. It has a membership of 20,000 and is affiliated with the International Trade Union Confederation. It also works with the National Union of the Unions of the Workers of Benin.

See also

 Trade unions in Benin

References

Trade unions in Benin
International Trade Union Confederation